Willard Ives (July 7, 1806 – April 19, 1896) was an American politician who served one term as a U.S. Representative from New York from 1851 to 1853.

Biography 
Born in Watertown, New York, Ives attended the common schools, also Belleville (New York) Academy, and Lowville (New York) Academy.
He engaged in agricultural pursuits and was also interested in banking.

He served as a delegate to the world convention of Methodists held in London, England, in 1846.

Congress 
He was an unsuccessful candidate for election to the Thirtieth Congress in 1848, but was elected as a Democrat to the Thirty-second Congress (March 4, 1851 – March 3, 1853).

Later career 
He served as president of Ives Seminary, Antwerp, New York, which he endowed.
He was one of the originators and organizers of Syracuse University and served on the board of trustees in 1870–1886.
He resumed agricultural pursuits.

Death 
He died in Watertown, New York, April 19, 1896.
He was interred in Brookside Cemetery.

Ives Seminary is named for him.

(**Note Biographical Directory erroneously lists Willard Ives as having served in the New York Assembly in 1829–30, when it was, in fact, Ives' father, Dr. Titus Ives (d. 1847), who served)

Sources

1806 births
1896 deaths
Democratic Party members of the United States House of Representatives from New York (state)
Syracuse University trustees
Methodists from New York (state)
19th-century American politicians